"Neophilia" is a CD single by Japanese singer and voice actress Aya Hirano. It was released on November 7, 2007 and was produced by Lantis. This is Aya Hirano's fifth maxi single and her second release from her three-month consecutive single release campaign.

Track listing
 "Neophilia" -4:02
 Vocals: Aya Hirano
 Lyrics: Shinya Saitou
 Guitar: Yutaka Ishii
 Bass: Katsuhiko Kurosu
 "Forget me nots..." -4:05
 Vocals: Aya Hirano
 Lyrics: Katsuhiko Kurosu
 Guitar: Daisuke Katou
 Bass: Katsuhiko Kurosu
 "Neophilia" (off vocal) -4:12
 "Forget me nots..." (off vocal) -4:02

References

2007 singles
Aya Hirano songs
Lantis (company) singles
2007 songs